Alexei Soutchkov, in Russian Алексе́й Никола́евич Сучко́в, often transliterated in English Alexey Suchkov (Moscow, April 3, 1966), is a Russian pianist, prize winner of seventy national and international piano competitions in the Soviet Union, Germany, France, Italy and in the United States of America.

Biography 
Born in a family of piano teachers, Soutchkov began his studies in the Central Music School of Moscow, after he has continued to study in the Moscow Conservatory "Tchaikovsky" with Professor Yevgeny Malinin (assistant to Maestro Heinrich Neuhaus), obtaining his Diploma and specialization in piano in 1991 and completing the doctorate of study in 1993.

He is the winner of First Prizes in national and international piano competitions: Cup Pianists of Italy in Osimo, Palma d'Oro in Finale Ligure, Seiler Prize in Palermo, Carlo Mosso Prize in Alessandria, International Piano Competition in Rome, Riviera Etrusca prize in Piombino, Onde Musicali prize in Taranto, Mario Polovineo Tribute in Teramo, Prize Citta di Brindisi, Prize Citta di Cesenatico, Pietro Argento Prize in Gioia del Colle.

He has given concerts as a soloist in the Soviet Union, Italy, Germany, France, Poland and in the United States of America. He is currently President of the Italian Artistic Association "Suchkov & Suchkov", founded in Sassuolo in 2011 together with his son Ivan, who is also a pianist and artistic director of the association.

References

External links 
 Official website
 Interview with Alexei Soutchkov
 (RU) Alexey Suchkov in the site of the Central Music School of Moscow
 (RU, EN) Alexey Suchkov in the site of the Moscow Conservatory

Russian classical pianists
Male classical pianists
1966 births
Moscow Conservatory alumni
Living people
21st-century classical pianists
21st-century Russian male musicians